The Hurricane Party is the eleventh novel by Swedish author Klas Östergren and was published in 2007. The English translation by Tiina Nunnally was published as part of the Canongate Myth Series in 2009. The novel is a reinterpretation of the Edda story about how Loki insults the Gods and gets his punishment.

References

External links

2007 Swedish novels
Novels by Klas Östergren
Swedish-language novels
Norse mythology in art and literature
Albert Bonniers Förlag books